Supachai or Suphachai (from ) is a Thai masculine given name. People with the name include:
Supachai Kamsab, Thai footballer
Supachai Komsilp, Thai footballer
Supachai Koysub, Thai athlete
Supachai Panitchpakdi, Thai politician
Supachai Phupa, Thai footballer
Supachai Tangwongsan, Thai computer scientist
Suphachai Chearavanont, CEO of Charoen Pokphand Group
Supachai Jaided, Thai footballer
Suphachai Phosu, Thai politician

Thai masculine given names